Paul and Gaëtan Brizzi (born December 24, 1951 in Paris, France) are twin  French artists, painters, illustrators, animators, and film directors.

Career

The Brizzis first made their name working in commercials and short films, including the award-winning short Fracture. In 1985, the brothers directed the animated film Asterix Versus Caesar (Astérix et la surprise de César) for Gaumont Film Company, and started their own animation studio, Brizzi Films, the following year. Brizzi Films worked on several international television series, including Babar and its feature film adaptation, Babar: The Movie (1989). In 1989, the Brizzis sold their studio to The Walt Disney Company, who first turned the facility into a satellite shop for Walt Disney Television Animation. The Brizzis worked as unit producers on several Disney TV shows and two films based on Disney TV shows, DuckTales the Movie: Treasure of the Lost Lamp (1990) and  A Goofy Movie (1995).

In 1994, Walt Disney Animation France was placed under the Walt Disney Feature Animation division, and after completing work on A Goofy Movie, the Brizzis moved to Los Angeles to work as storyboard/concept artists and sequence directors on The Hunchback of Notre Dame (1996). They also worked extensively on Tarzan (1999), and developed and directed the Firebird Suite sequence in Fantasia 2000 (1999).

The Brizzis left Disney in 2001, and the studio in France was closed down in 2002 during a massive downsizing of Feature Animation. The brothers continued to work on their personal art and painting projects, and were briefly signed to direct Cloudy with a Chance of Meatballs at Sony Pictures Animation. Following work as story artists on the Tim Burton-produced 9, the brothers had been working with Mick Jagger on a film entitled Ruby Tuesday, which will present animated interpretations of songs by Jagger's band The Rolling Stones.

In 2015 they released the comic book La Cavale du Dr Destouches, which they made in collaboration with Christophe Malavoy. The comic is based on Louis-Ferdinand Céline's novels Castle to Castle, North and Rigadoon, which form a trilogy about his experiences from the Sigmaringen enclave during World War II.

Selected filmography
Fracture (1977, short) – directors
Chronique 1909 (1982)
 Asterix Versus Caesar/Astérix et la surprise de César (1985) – directors
Babar (1989, television series) – Unit producers
Babar: The Movie (1989) – Unit directors
 DuckTales the Movie: Treasure of the Lost Lamp (1990) – Unit producers
 TaleSpin (1990, television series) – Unit producers
 Winnie the Pooh and Christmas Too – Unit producers
 A Goofy Movie (1995) – Unit producers, sequence directors
 The Hunchback of Notre Dame (1996) – storyboard artists, visual development, sequence director (Paul)
 Tarzan (1999) – storyboard artists, visual development
 Fantasia 2000 (1999) – storyboard artists, visual development, directors: Firebird Suite
 Enchanted (2007) – storyboard artists
 9 (2009) – storyboard artists
 Kahlil Gibran's The Prophet (2015) – storyboard artists, segment directors
 Space Jam: A New Legacy (2021) - storyboard artists

See also
Jerusalem 2111
Walt Disney Animation France

References

External links

BrizziBrothers.com – official website

1951 births
French animated film directors
Film directors from Paris
French animators
French comics artists
20th-century French painters
20th-century male artists
French male painters
21st-century French painters
21st-century male artists
French illustrators
Walt Disney Animation Studios people
French storyboard artists
Sibling filmmakers
Sibling duos
French twins
Living people
French emigrants to the United States